The two-forked murex (Chicoreus cervicornis) also known as the deer antler murex is a species of sea snail, a marine gastropod mollusk in the family Muricidae, the murex snails or rock snails.

Description
The shell sizes this species ranges from 4–7 cm (40-75mm).

Distribution
The marine species occurs off North Australia and West New Guinea.

References

 Lamarck, J. B. P. A., 1822 Histoire naturelle des animaux sans vertèbres, vol. 7, p. 711 pp
 Houart, R., 1992. The genus Chicoreus and related genera (Gastropoda: Muricidae) in the Indo-West Pacific. Mémoires du Muséum national d'Histoire naturelle 154(A): 1-188

External links
 MNHN, Paris: lectotype

Muricidae
Gastropods described in 1822